"Ding Dong Bell" or "Ding Dong Dell" is a popular English language nursery rhyme. It has a Roud Folk Song Index number of 12853.

Lyrics

The most common modern version is:

Origins
  

The earliest recorded reference to the rhyme is from John Lant, the organist of Winchester Cathedral in 1580, who recorded the following rhyme:

It was printed in Thomas Ravenscroft's Pammelia, Musicks Miscellanie in 1609, as a canon for four voices.

The phrase 'Ding, dong, bell' also appears in these passages of Shakespeare's plays:

The Tempest, Act I, Scene II:

The Merchant of Venice, Act III, Scene II:

The earliest version to resemble the modern one is from Mother Goose's Melody published in London around 1765. The additional lines that include (arguably) the more acceptable ending for children with the survival of the cat are in James Orchard Halliwell's Nursery Rhymes of England, where the cat is pulled out by "Dog with long snout".

Several names are used for the malevolent Johnny Green, including Tommy O' Linne (1797) and Tommy Quin (c. 1840). Iona and Peter Opie suggested that it may have had its origins in Tom a lin or Tom o' Lin, the protagonist of another nursery rhyme.

William Stonard's composition

There is also a version composed as a four-part round by William Stonard (1585–1630) to the following text:

Reformed versions

The most common modern version is arguably already a moderation of the theme of the original rhyme. The fear that children might be affected by the violence of the rhyme and specifically that children might be tempted to put cats in wells, led to several attempts to reform the rhyme. In his New Nursery Rhymes for Old (1949) Geoffrey Hall published the following alternative:

A modern version replaces the word "pussy" with "kitty".

References 

English nursery rhymes
Cats in literature
16th-century songs
Songwriter unknown
Year of song unknown
Songs about cats
English children's songs
English folk songs
Traditional children's songs